Claude Colette (4 May 1929 – 20 September 1990) was a French professional racing cyclist. He rode in six editions of the Tour de France.

References

External links
 

1929 births
1990 deaths
French male cyclists
People from Châtellerault
Sportspeople from Vienne
Cyclists from Nouvelle-Aquitaine